Kosmos 219 ( meaning Cosmos 219), also known as DS-U2-D No.2, was a Soviet satellite which was launched in 1968 as part of the Dnepropetrovsk Sputnik programme. It was a  spacecraft, which was built by the Yuzhnoye Design Bureau, and was used to investigate flows of charged particles in the magnetosphere of the Earth.

A Kosmos-2I 63SM carrier rocket was used to launch Kosmos 219 into low Earth orbit. The launch took place from Site 86/4 at Kapustin Yar. The launch occurred at 04:42:56 GMT on 26 April 1968, and resulted in the successful insertion of the satellite into orbit. Upon reaching orbit, the satellite was assigned its Kosmos designation, and received the International Designator 1968-038A. The North American Aerospace Air Command assigned it the catalogue number 03220.

Kosmos 219 was the second of two DS-U2-D satellites to be launched, after Kosmos 137. It completed operations on 28 February 1969, before decaying from orbit and reentering the atmosphere on 2 March.

See also

1968 in spaceflight

References

Spacecraft launched in 1968
Kosmos satellites
Dnepropetrovsk Sputnik program